Percy Thomas Francis (6 May 1875 – 8 September 1964) was an  English cricketer, who played three first-class matches for Worcestershire in 1901 and 1902. He later appeared for Suffolk in minor cricket.

Much Francis's highest score was the 66 he hit in the second innings of his debut against Cambridge University at Fenner's.

He was born in Badwell Ash, Suffolk; he died at the age of 89 in Branksome, Poole, Dorset.

References

External links
 

1875 births
1964 deaths
English cricketers
Worcestershire cricketers
People from Mid Suffolk District
People from Branksome, Dorset
Cricketers from Dorset
Suffolk cricketers